Ambrose Edgar Woodall, 1st Baron Uvedale of North End MD, FRCS (24 April 1885 – 28 February 1974), known as Sir Ambrose Woodall between 1931 and 1946, was a British surgeon.

Woodall was Resident Surgeon at Manor House Hospital from 1921 to 1958 and Medical Adviser to the National Union of Railway Men and other unions from 1922 to 1958. He was knighted in 1931 and elevated to the peerage as Baron Uvedale of North End, of North End in the County of Middlesex, in 1946.

Woodall was childless and his title became extinct upon his death on 28 February 1974, aged 88.

Arms

References

External links

1885 births
1974 deaths
Fellows of the Royal College of Surgeons
Barons created by George VI